is a city located in Kagoshima Prefecture, Japan.

Kirishima has the second largest population of the cities in Kagoshima Prefecture. It is a crossroads for commerce between Kagoshima and Miyazaki Prefectures. It is also the home of the Kagoshima Airport, the terminus for the JR Hisatsu line, and is served by two major expressways. The former Kokubu-Hayato area was designated as a "Technopolis" as high tech industries such as Sony and Kyocera opened facilities in the city.

The modern city of Kirishima was established on November 7, 2005, from the merger of the city of Kokubu, and the towns of Fukuyama, Hayato, Kirishima (former), Makizono, Mizobe and Yokogawa (all from Aira District).

The Uenohara site dates from the Jōmon period. Shrines include Kirishima-Jingū.

Topography
Mountains
Mount Kirishima (see List of volcanoes in Japan)
Takachiho no-mine
Shinmoedake
Karakuni dake
Eboshi dake
National park
Kirishima-Yaku National Park
Plain: Kokubu

Geography

Climate
Kirishima has a humid subtropical climate (Köppen climate classification Cfa) with hot summers and mild winters. Precipitation is significant throughout the year, and is heavier in summer, especially the months of June and July.

Surrounding municipalities
Kagoshima Prefecture
Aira
Kanoya
Satsuma
Satsumasendai
Soo
Tarumizu
Yūsui
Miyazaki Prefecture
Ebino
Kobayashi
Miyakonojō
Takaharu

Demography 
According to Japanese census data, this is the population of Kirishima in recent years.

Notable place
 Kokubu Castle - A castle ruin, death place of Shimazu Yoshihisa

Economy

Japan Air Commuter has its headquarters in Kirishima.

Transportation

Railways
Both lines are operated by Kyushu Railway Company (JR Kyushu)
Nippō Main Line
Hisatsu Line

Highways
National Route 10
National Route 220
National Route 223
National Route 504
Kyushu Expressway
Higashi Kyushu Expressway

Bus
Kagoshima Kotsu
Iwasaki Bus Network
Nangoku Kotsu

Airport
Kagoshima Airport in City of Kirishima

Education
Shigakukan University

See also

Matsushita Museum of Art

References

External links

 
 Kagoshima Prefectural Visitors Bureau official website 

 
Cities in Kagoshima Prefecture
Kyocera
Japan Self-Defense Forces